Shelley's oliveback (Nesocharis shelleyi), also known as the Fernando Po oliveback, is a species of estrildid finch found in Africa. It has an estimated global extent of occurrence of 55,000 km2.

It is found in Bioko island, western Cameroon and adjacent Nigeria. The IUCN has classified the species as being of least concern.

References

External links
BirdLife International species factsheet

Fernando Po oliveback
Birds of the Gulf of Guinea
Birds of Central Africa
Shelley's oliveback
Taxa named by Boyd Alexander